The Dunedin mayoral election held on 21 July 1865 was the inaugural mayoral election in Dunedin, New Zealand.

Five candidates stood for election. William Mason was successful, with James Paterson coming second. The other three candidates received much fewer votes than those two candidates. Edward Cargill acted as returning officer. Polling was undertaken in four wards: South, High, Bell, and Leith. A secret ballot based on the first-past-the-post voting system was used in Dunedin, in contrast to Christchurch and Wellington, where mayors were chosen by the city councillors amongst themselves until 1875.

References

1865 elections in New Zealand
Mayoral elections in Dunedin
Politics of Dunedin
1860s in Dunedin